Hebius johannis, Johann's keelback, is a species of snake of the family Colubridae. The snake is found in China.

References 

johannis
Reptiles of China
Reptiles described in 1908
Taxa named by George Albert Boulenger